The women's 5000 metres at the 2017 Asian Winter Games was held on February 22, 2017 in Obihiro, Japan.

Schedule
All times are Japan Standard Time (UTC+09:00)

Records

Results

References

External links
Results

Women 5000